The Somers Cove Light was a screw-pile lighthouse located near Crisfield, Maryland. Dismantled early, its remains are a landmark to watermen in the area.

History
Unlike many other screw-pile lighthouses it was apparently never threatened by ice, and thus passed a quiet life until it was dismantled in 1932, replaced by a skeleton tower. The ferry to Tangier Island passes its remains.

On October 26, 2021, the remains of the light collapsed during a storm.

References

Somers Cove Light, from the Chesapeake Chapter of the United States Lighthouse Society

External links

Houses completed in 1867
Crisfield, Maryland
Lighthouses in the Chesapeake Bay
Lighthouses in Somerset County, Maryland